Mount Guyot is a mountain in the eastern Great Smoky Mountains, located in the southeastern United States.  At  in elevation, Guyot is the fourth-highest summit in the Eastern U.S., and the second-highest in the Great Smoky Mountains National Park.  While the mountain is remote, the Appalachian Trail crosses its south slope, passing to within  of the summit.

Mount Guyot lies on the Tennessee-North Carolina border, between Sevier County and Haywood County. There are two peaks atop the mountain approximately one-half mile apart, with the southwestern peak being the true summit. Ramsey Cascades, one of the park's most spectacular waterfalls, spills down a sandstone cliff near the bottom of Guyot's western slope.

A dense stand of Southern Appalachian spruce-fir forest coats the summit and upper slopes of  Guyot.  Human settlement never expanded deep into the eastern Smokies, so the area around Guyot and adjacent peaks suffered substantially less disturbance than the mountains in the western or central parts of the range. A long hike and a challenging bushwhack are required to reach the summit, the highest in the Eastern U.S. without a trail.

Geology 
Mount Guyot is composed of Precambrian rocks of the Ocoee Supergroup, formed from ocean sediments approximately one billion years ago.  The mountain is underlain by Thunderhead sandstone, which is common throughout the Smokies.  The Thunderhead sandstone was thrust over Roaring Fork sandstone several hundred million years ago.  Mt. Guyot itself was formed during the Appalachian orogeny over 200 million years ago, when the North American and African plates collided, thrusting the rock upward.

History 

Mount Guyot was named in honor of Swiss geographer Arnold Guyot by Guyot's friend, Samuel Buckley. Buckley was a naturalist who accompanied Thomas Lanier Clingman on a survey expedition to the crest of the Smokies in 1858. While Buckley's measurements were often wildly inaccurate, Guyot conducted an expedition the following year, recording more accurate elevations and giving preliminary names to various peaks along the crest.

Regarding the Eastern Smokies, surveyors and authors alike agreed on one thing: the region was very remote and isolated.  Guyot said of the area, "neither the white man or the Indian hunter venture in this wilderness."  For Horace Kephart, who wrote extensively on the Smoky Mountains in the early 1900s, Mt. Guyot was the climax of a dense, virtually-insurmountable wilderness:

Kephart goes on to relate the account of James Ferris and his wife, two naturalists who bushwhacked their way across the crest of the Smokies to Mt. Guyot in 1900.  According to Mrs. Ferris:

Mt. Guyot remained isolated until the Civilian Conservation Corps constructed a segment of the Appalachian Trail across the mountain's western slope in 1935.  Although the trail opened up the heart of the Eastern Smokies to backpackers, access remained relatively difficult.  According to author Laura Thornborough, who climbed Guyot in the late 1930s:

Thornborough followed the route out of Greenbrier that ascends Guyot's western slope.  She recalls that "there was no trail to Guyot, not even a dim one, but our guides knew the way."  The party followed Ramsay Prong until it became "a mere trickle of water," and emerged near modern-day Guyot Spring.  From the state line, they found a "dim trail" leading to the summit.  Thornborough concludes her report by saying, "if it is wilderness you want, then go to Guyot."

Access 

The Appalachian Trail and the Balsam Mountain Trail intersect just south of Guyot
at Tricorner Knob.  They are the only maintained trails to traverse the mountain.

From the Cosby Campground (specifically behind Campsite B51), the Snake Den Ridge Trail 
winds  to its intersection with the Appalachian Trail at Inadu Knob.  From this

A  section of the Appalachian Trail stretches from Newfound Gap to Tricorner Knob, near Guyot's south slope.

While Guyot's eastern slope is very steep, its western slope, known as Guyot Spur, descends gradually for nearly five miles to the Little Pigeon River.  A well-known bushwhack follows the creek on the north side of Guyot Spur, starting at Ramsay Cascades and emerging on the Appalachian Trail near Guyot Spring (probably the same path Thornborough's guides followed in the 1930s).  This route is approximately eight miles from the Ramsay Cascades Trail parking area, four miles (6 km) of which are maintained trail.

While the summit is less than a half-mile from the Appalachian Trail, the thick forest makes any bushwhack a challenge.  A faint manway rises from Guyot Spring to the northern summit, although the manway is heavily overgrown.  Dead Fraser fir blowdowns and low visibility complicate navigation from any direction.

References

External links

 Great Smoky Mountains National Park Trail Map - Large file in .pdf format.
 Tricorner Knob Shelter - Information on the back country shelter near Mt. Guyot's southern slope.
 South Beyond 6000 in the Eastern Smokies - Information provided by the Carolina Hiking Club for climbing Mt. Guyot and other nearby high peaks.
 The Mount Guyot page at Summitpost.org

Mountains of Great Smoky Mountains National Park
Guyot (Great Smoky Mountains)
Mountains of Tennessee
Mountains of North Carolina
Southern Sixers
Protected areas of Haywood County, North Carolina
Protected areas of Sevier County, Tennessee
Mountains of Haywood County, North Carolina
Mountains of Sevier County, Tennessee